Shangqiu Daily, also known as Shangqiu Ribao, is a simplified Chinese newspaper published in the People's Republic of China, it is the organ newspaper of the Shangqiu Municipal Committee of the Chinese Communist Party (CCP). The newspaper is Shangqiu's official media, sponsored and supervised by the Shangqiu Municipal Committee of the CCP.

Shangqiu Daily was originally founded by the Shangqiu County Party Department of the Kuomintang (国民党商丘县党部) in 1947, and ceased publication in May 1948. After the founding of the People’s Republic of China, Shangqiu Post (商丘报) was inaugurated on January 1, 1985, which was renamed to its current name on January 1, 1993.

References

Mass media in Henan
Publications established in 1947
Daily newspapers published in China
Chinese-language newspapers (Simplified Chinese)